Face to Face was a Sunday morning political talk program. It first ran on Network Ten in August 1988 and was hosted by the then Political Editor Kerry O'Brien and produced by Chris Doig. The program was originally broadcast from the studios of CTC Canberra, ATV Melbourne and TEN Sydney – each with identical sets. Network Ten cancelled the program in 1989.

From 19 November 1995 and in 1999 Face to Face became a segment of Sunday Sunrise on the Seven Network.

In November 1995 assumed a format closer to its origins as a small-budget national political interview show, which featured an interview with a guest about the week's most important national issue. It aired late Sunday night (following the Sunday night movie) hosted by Neil Mercer.

Guests were interviewed live in the studio, instead of pre-recording.

In 1997, Stan Grant became the host until mid year when Chris Bath took over. In 1998, Bath moved to Witness and Glenn Milne took over.

In 1999 it became a segment of Sunday Sunrise and ceased to be a stand-alone programme. During that year the segments changed from being live with Glenn Milne (flown to Sydney each every Sunday) to being a Friday night pre-record by Stan Grant.

References

Australian television news shows
Australian television talk shows
1995 Australian television series debuts
1998 Australian television series endings